Cape Scott is a cape at the western side of the terminus of Dennistoun Glacier on the northern coast of Victoria Land in Antarctica.

References 

Headlands of Victoria Land
Pennell Coast